Sherman George Landers (March 24, 1898 – May 15, 1994) was an American track and field athlete who competed in the 1920 Summer Olympics. He was born in Oregon, Illinois and died in Springfield Township, Delaware County, Pennsylvania.

In 1920 he finished fifth in the triple jump competition.  Landers-Loomis Field at Oregon High School in Oregon, Illinois, is named in part for him, and for his Oregon and Olympic teammate Frank Loomis.

References

External links
 
 Landers-Loomis Field History

1898 births
1994 deaths
People from Oregon, Illinois
American male triple jumpers
Olympic track and field athletes of the United States
Athletes (track and field) at the 1920 Summer Olympics